Seamus Donnelly (born 25 May 1971) is an Irish retired professional footballer who played professionally in the United States.

An aspiring Irish footballer, Donnelly broke his leg playing for Home Farm when he was eighteen years old. The injury put him out of playing for nearly a year and a half after which he played at the amateur level. While visiting family in Ireland, Sean Kenny, an assistant college coach in the United States, saw Donnelly playing in an amateur match. Kenny suggested Donnelly attend Franklin Pierce College on a soccer scholarship. He did so and was a 1995 First Team and 1996 Second Team Division II NCAA All American soccer player.

References

External links
Charleston Battery: Seamus Donnelly
Seamus Donnelly
Seamus Donnelly: Not Your Typical Hero

1971 births
Living people
Republic of Ireland association footballers
Republic of Ireland expatriate association footballers
Charleston Battery players
Franklin Pierce Ravens men's soccer players
Seacoast United Phantoms players
Virginia Beach Mariners players
Penn FC players
USISL players
Association football forwards